Otto Thomsen (June 21, 1884 – October 22, 1926) was an American gymnast. He competed in three events at the 1904 Summer Olympics.

References

External links
 

1884 births
1926 deaths
American male artistic gymnasts
Olympic gymnasts of the United States
Gymnasts at the 1904 Summer Olympics
People from Scott County, Iowa